Miss Brazil 2008 was the 54th edition of the Miss Brazil pageant. It was held on 13 April 2008 at Citibank Hall in São Paulo, São Paulo State, Brazil and was hosted by Nayla Micherif and Guilherme Arruda with Renata Fan as a commentator. Natália Guimarães of Minas Gerais crowned her successor Natálya Anderle of Rio Grande do Sul at the end of the event. Anderle represented Brazil at the Miss Universe 2008 pageant. 1st Runner-Up, Vanessa Vidal of Ceará represented the country at Miss International 2008.

Results

Special Awards

Contestants
The delegates for Miss Brazil 2008 were:

 - Achemar Souza de Castro
 - Williana Graziella Siqueira
 - Kamila Katrine Campos Batista
 - Gabrielle Costa de Souza
 - Daniele Valadão Pinto
 - Vanessa Lima Vidal
 - Ludmylla Costa Basthos
 - Francielem Ramos Riguete
 - Cyntia Cordeiro e Souza
 - Roberta Ribeiro Tavares
 - Flávia Piana Pereira
 - Pilar Velásquez
 - Tainara Ferreira da Silva Terenada
 - Bruna dos Santos Pontes
 - Kayonara Walleska de Macedo Silva
 - Bronie Cordeiro Alteiro
 - Michelle Fernandes da Costa
 - Marinna de Paiva Lima
 - Camilla Paiva Hentzy
 - Andressa Simone Mello
 - Natálya Alberto Anderle
 - Maíra Mallmann Lima
 - Emmyllie Daniele Muniz Cruz
 - Gabriela Pinho
 - Janaína Barcelos de Morais
 - Karina Aparecida Borges
 - Kelly Bezerra de Aquino

References

External links 
Official Miss Brasil Website

2008
2008 in Brazil
2008 beauty pageants